Saliutas Vilnius was a Lithuanian football club from Vilnius.

History 

The club, originally called Karininkų Namai, was founded in 1945 as military officers team. In 1951 it was renamed Saliutas, but in 1952 it became Karininkų Namai again. In that year, it won the Lithuanian SSR Top League and the Lithuanian Cup (Tiesa Cup). It also played in the Soviet Cup, where it beat Burevestnik Kisinev (0:0 and 1:0), Dinamo Frunze (walkover), and in eight-final lost to FC Dynamo Moscow (1:4). In 1956, The team's name changed to Raudonoji Žvaigždė. In 1959, many former Spartakas Vilnius players had joined. In 1962, it was re-given the name Saliutas. The club left the Lithuanian SSR Championship in the middle of 1968 season, replaced by Pažanga Vilnius.

Name history 
1945 – Karininkų namai (KN Vilnius) (English: Officers' house)
1951 – Saliutas
1952 – Karininkų namai
1956 – Raudonoji žvaigždė (English: Red Star)
1962 – Saliutas

Achievements 
Lithuanian SSR Top League
Winners (3): 1952, 1958–1959, 1967
Runners-up (3): 1958, 1959–1960, 1965
Third places (1): 1966
Lithuanian Cup (Tiesa Cup):
Winners (2): 1952, 1963
Runners-up (3): 1956, 1965, 1966

External links 
Statistics – futbolinis.lt

Defunct football clubs in Lithuania
Football clubs in Vilnius
1945 establishments in Lithuania
1968 disestablishments in Lithuania
Association football clubs established in 1945
Association football clubs disestablished in 1968